Samuel Lucas (1805–1870) was a British amateur painter who worked in Hitchin as a brewer.

Biography

Samuel Lucas (Snr) was born, lived and died in Hitchin in Hertfordshire. Because his family were in the Society of Friends, Samuel was required to concentrate on his academic studies although his primary interest was art. He established himself in business and in his spare time he painted using both oils and water colours.

A notable friendship was with Jacob Thompson of Penrith (1806–79). Lucas would visit Thompson and they would paint around the now lost landscape that is now beneath Haweswater Reservoir in the Lake District.

His son, also named Samuel and also an artist, bought a cottage in the Lake District. His granddaughter, Florence Davy Thompson, the founding librarian of the University of Manitoba, was also an accomplished artist.

Legacy
Lucas died in Hitchin in 1870. Many of his prints are in the British Museum and his paintings are important possessions of the Hitchin Museum and Art Gallery. A junior school in Hitchin is also named after him. His biography, Samuel Lucas, His Life and Art Work by Reginald Hine, was published by Walkers Galleries Ltd in 1928.

References

1805 births
1870 deaths
People from Hitchin
English watercolourists
19th-century British painters